Clyde Arbuckle (1903–1998) was an American historian of, and lifelong resident of, San Jose, California. He is the author of Clyde Arbuckle's History of San José. This 500 page book has been extensively referenced by historians.

Early life
Arbuckle was the son of W. J. Arbuckle, and the brother of Roscoe "Fatty" Arbuckle, a silent film star. As a young man, Arbuckle played the banjo. Arbuckle was also a road bicycle racer with the Garden City Wheelmen, San Jose residents have named a public school in his memory, and a referee at the Burbank Velodrome. In 1922 he set a national cycling speed record.

Career

Arbuckle was the founder and curator of the San José Historical Museum (now called History San Jose). He was secretary of the San Jose Historic Landmarks Commission.

Arbuckle was San Jose's official historian for more than fifty years. During this time he amassed a large collection of photographs of the area, which are now housed at the San Jose Public Library. The photographs have been used to illustrate many history books.

A biography of Arbuckle's life, Clyde Arbuckle: A 90 Year Biography, was written by Leonard McKay published by Memorobilia of San Jose in 1993. Arbuckle died in 1998.

Publications
Santa Clara County Ranchos, 1968
Oil Boring in Santa Clara Valley, 1959
Clyde Arbuckle's history of San Jose, 1985.
History of San José: Transportation - Volume 5, 2004
New Almaden Mercury Mines: A Long Perspective and History, 1965, with A. C. Innes and R. Burton Rose.

References 

 Arbuckle, Jim. "Clyde Arbuckle in Restless Valley." http://www.mountaincharlie1850.org/restless_valley_video2.html Retrieved August 24, 2012
 Barnes, Cecily. "Renowned chronicler of the past becomes part of history: Clyde Arbuckle, an expert on San Jose history, dies at 94." Mercury News. "http://mytown.mercurynews.com/archives/wgresident/01.14.98/ClydeArbuckle.html Retrieved August 24, 2012

External links
 History San José, http://historysanjose.org/wp/about-us/history/
 Guide to the Clyde Arbuckle California History Research Collection, 1840-1996 
http://digitalcollections.sjlibrary.org/cdm/landingpage/collection/arbuckle

1903 births
1998 deaths
People from San Jose, California
Writers from the San Francisco Bay Area
20th-century American historians
American male non-fiction writers
20th-century American male writers
Historians from California